João Ananias Jordão Júnior (born January 12, 1991 in Recife), also known as João Ananias, is a Brazilian football player who plays for Njarðvík as a defensive midfielder.

Career
In the summer 2019, Ananias joined Latvian club FK Ventspils. However, he left the club two months later after playing only one cup game for the club. He returned to Brazil to play for futsal team Náutico Fut7. On 4 November it was announced, that he would join Ríver Atlético Clube from the 2020 season.

In May 2021, Ananias joined Treze, having spend the first part of the year playing for Anápolis.

References

External links
 

1991 births
Living people
Brazilian footballers
Brazilian expatriate footballers
Association football defenders
Clube Náutico Capibaribe players
W Connection F.C. players
Santa Cruz Futebol Clube players
Cuiabá Esporte Clube players
Salgueiro Atlético Clube players
Joinville Esporte Clube players
FK Ventspils players
River Atlético Clube players
Grêmio Esportivo Brasil players
Anápolis Futebol Clube players
Treze Futebol Clube players
Latvian Higher League players
Campeonato Brasileiro Série B players
Campeonato Brasileiro Série C players
Campeonato Brasileiro Série D players
Association football midfielders
Brazilian expatriate sportspeople in Trinidad and Tobago
Brazilian expatriate sportspeople in Latvia
Expatriate footballers in Trinidad and Tobago
Expatriate footballers in Latvia
Sportspeople from Recife